Wolverine: Prodigal Son is an Amerimanga written by Antony Johnston with art by Wilson Tortosa published by Del Rey Manga in 2009. Only one volume was released, the second one has been canceled.

References

Wolverine (comics) titles
Manga based on comics